William Eldridge Frenzel (July 31, 1928 – November 17, 2014) was a Republican member of the United States House of Representatives from Minnesota, representing Minnesota's Third District, which included the southern and western suburbs of Minneapolis.

Early life and career 
Frenzel was educated at the Saint Paul Academy in Saint Paul, Minnesota, and earned both a B.A. (1950) and M.A. (1951) from Dartmouth College. He served as a lieutenant in the United States Naval Reserve during the Korean War from 1951 to 1954.

Frenzel served eight years in the Minnesota House of Representatives from 1962 to 1970, prior to serving in the U.S. Congress. He was president of the No. Waterway Terminals Corp. (1965–70) and of Minneapolis Terminal Warehouse Company (1966–1970). He was a member of the executive committee for Hennepin County, Minnesota (1966–1967).

House of Representatives 
Frenzel was elected as a Republican to the 92nd, 93rd, 94th, 95th, 96th, 97th, 98th, 99th, 100th, and 101st congresses, serving from January 3, 1971 to January 3, 1991, and was the ranking Republican on the House Budget Committee and a member of the influential Ways and Means Committee. He was a Congressional Representative to the General Agreement on Tariffs and Trade (GATT) in Geneva for 15 years. Frenzel became known as an expert in budget and fiscal policy, election law, trade, taxes and congressional procedures, and was a negotiator in the 1990 budget summit. During the Iran–Iraq War of the 1980s, Frenzel was a proponent of economic ties to the regime of Saddam Hussein, and opposed congressional efforts to condemn Iraqi war crimes such as the infamous Halabja chemical attack, the deadliest chemical-weapons attack in history, on the grounds that they would disrupt future trade with Iraq. He also served as vice chairman of the Committee on House Administration, and vice chairman of the Commission on Congressional Mailing Standards. He did not run for re-election to the House in 1990.

Post-Congressional career 
Frenzel was chairman of the Ripon Society, a Republican think-tank, from the 1990s until March 2004. He has been a Guest Scholar at the Brookings Institution in Washington, DC, since January 1991, and was named director of the Brookings Governmental Affairs Institute on July 18, 1997.

President Bill Clinton appointed Frenzel (1993) to help sell the North American Free Trade Agreement.

In 2001, President George W. Bush appointed him to a commission to study the Social Security system, and, in 2002, to the Advisory Committee on Trade Policy and Negotiations (ACTPN), which he chairs. He was interviewed on NPR's All Things Considered, on December 20, 2004, as an advocate of President Bush's plan for Social Security privatization.

At the time of his death, he was chairman of the Pew Commission on Children in Foster Care, the Vice Chairman of the Eurasia Foundation, Chairman of the Japan-America Society of Washington, Chairman of the U.S. Steering Committee of the Transatlantic Policy Network, Co-Chairman of the Center for Strategic Tax Reform, Co-Chairman of the Bretton Woods Committee, Co-Chairman of the Committee For A Responsible Federal Budget, a member of the Executive Committee of the Committee on U.S.-China Relations, and Chairman of the Executive Committee of the International Tax and Investment Center.

He was an alternate board member of the Office of Congressional Ethics (as of 2011.)

Policy opinions

On political gridlock
Frenzel wrote in 1995:
 (Checks and Balances, 8)

The historian of the Republican party, Geoffrey Kabaservice has identified Frenzel as a key moderate Republican within the post-war GOP.

Family and personal life
Frenzel and his wife Ruth had three daughters. In 2000, he was awarded the Order of the Rising Sun, Gold and Silver Star, by the Emperor of Japan. In 2002, he received an Honorary Doctor of Laws Degree from Hamline University.

In 1984, the National Coalition for Science and Technology named him a "friend of science."

Death
Frenzel died of cancer on November 17, 2014 in McLean, Virginia.

References

External links 
 
 
 the Bill Frenzel Papers, available for research use at the Minnesota Historical Society
 Minnesota Legislators Past and Present
  Biography

1928 births
2014 deaths
Republican Party members of the Minnesota House of Representatives
Dartmouth College alumni
Hamline University alumni
Politicians from Saint Paul, Minnesota
Businesspeople from Saint Paul, Minnesota
Republican Party members of the United States House of Representatives from Minnesota
20th-century American politicians
Deaths from cancer in Virginia
20th-century American businesspeople
Brookings Institution people